American boy band B2K has released 3 studio albums, eleven singles, two compilation albums, two remix albums and one soundtrack album.

B2K released their debut studio album, B2K, in March 2002. It included the singles "Uh Huh", "Gots Ta Be" and "Why I Love You". The album sold well enough in its first week to enter the US Billboard 200 at number 2 and the Top R&B/Hip-Hop Albums chart at number 1. The bands second studio album, a Christmas album, Santa Hooked Me Up, was released in October 2002 and reached number 132 on the Billboard 200. One single, "Why'd You Leave Me on Christmas" was released. Pandemonium!, the bands last studio album was released in December 2002. It peaked at number 10 on the Billboard 200, the album's first single, "Bump, Bump, Bump" (featuring P. Diddy) reached number 1 on the Billboard Hot 100.

Albums

Studio albums

Compilation albums

Remix albums

Soundtrack album

Singles

References

Discographies of American artists
Pop music group discographies
Contemporary R&B discographies